Jenah Rural District is a rural district (dehestan) in the Jenah District of Bastak County, Hormozgan Province, Iran. At the 2006 census, its population was 5,760, in 1,180 families.  The rural district has 10 villages.

References 

3.	الكوخردى ، محمد ، بن يوسف، (كُوخِرد حَاضِرَة اِسلامِيةَ عَلي ضِفافِ نَهر مِهران) الطبعة الثالثة ،دبى: سنة 199۷ للميلاد Mohammed Kookherdi (1997) Kookherd, an Islamic civil at Mehran river,  third edition: Dubai
4.	محمدیان، کوخری، محمد ، “ (به یاد کوخرد) “، ج1. ج2. چاپ اول، دبی: سال انتشار 2003 میلادی Mohammed Kookherdi Mohammadyan (2003), Beyade Kookherd, third edition : Dubai.
5.محمدیان، کوخردی ، محمد ،  «شهرستان بستک و بخش کوخرد»  ، ج۱. چاپ اول، دبی: سال انتشار ۲۰۰۵ میلادی Mohammed Kookherdi Mohammadyan (2005), Shahrestan  Bastak & Bakhshe Kookherd, First edition : Dubai.
6.عباسی ، قلی، مصطفی،  «بستک وجهانگیریه»، چاپ اول، تهران : ناشر: شرکت انتشارات جهان
7.   سلامى، بستكى، احمد.  (بستک در گذرگاه تاریخ)  ج2 چاپ اول، 1372 خورشيدى
8. اطلس گیتاشناسی استان‌های ایران [Atlas Gitashenasi Ostanhai Iran] (Gitashenasi Province Atlas of Iran)

Rural Districts of Hormozgan Province
Bastak County